2002 Continental Championships may refer to:

African Championships
 Football (soccer): 2002 African Cup of Nations

Asian Championships
 Football (soccer): 2001–02 Asian Club Championship
 Multisport: 2002 Asian Games
 Swimming: 2002 Pan Pacific Swimming Championships

European Championships
 Artistic gymnastics: 2002 European Rhythmic Gymnastics Championships
 Athletics: 2002 European Athletics Championships
 Figure skating: 2002 European Figure Skating Championships
 Football (soccer): 2001–02 UEFA Champions League
 Football (soccer): 2001–02 UEFA Cup
 Football (soccer): 2002 UEFA European Under-17 Championship
 Football (soccer): 2001–02 UEFA Women's Cup
 Volleyball: 2002–03 CEV Champions League
 Volleyball: 2002–03 CEV Women's Champions League

Oceanian Championships
 Swimming: 2002 Oceania Swimming Championships

Pan American Championships / North American Championships
 Cycling: 2002 Pan American Cycling Championships
 Football (soccer): 2002 CONCACAF Champions' Cup
 Football (soccer): 2002 CONCACAF Women's Gold Cup

South American Championships
 Football (soccer): 2002 Copa Libertadores

See also
 2002 World Championships (disambiguation)
 2002 World Junior Championships (disambiguation)
 2002 World Cup
 Continental championship (disambiguation)

Continental championships